Haycock is an unincorporated community and mining camp in the Nome Census Area, Alaska, United States.

History
The community was founded in 1914 as a mining camp; it had a post office from 1916 until 1957.

Demographics

Haycock first appeared on the 1920 U.S. Census as an unincorporated village. It appeared again in 1930 and 1940. It has not returned since.

Notable person
William E. Beltz, carpenter and politician, was born in Haycock.

Notes

Unincorporated communities in Nome Census Area, Alaska
Unincorporated communities in Alaska
Mining communities in Alaska